ALBA-1 is a submarine communications cable for telecommunications between Cuba and Venezuela.

The fiber cable was laid by the Venezuelan government in 2010 and 2011. After an unexplained dormancy of two years, Doug Madory's Internet routing analysis revealed that it was activated on Tuesday, January 15, 2013. The Cuban state organ Granma issued a confirmation two days later. ALBA-1 is named after the Latin American Bolivarian Alliance for the Peoples of Our America (ALBA) (Spanish: Alianza Bolivariana para los Pueblos de Nuestra América).
It extends between La Guaira (Venezuela), Siboney, Cuba and Ocho Rios (Jamaica).

External links 
 Internet in Kuba: Das Volk muss auf die Kriechspur Spiegel Online, 16 January 2012

References

Submarine communications cables in the Caribbean Sea
Fiber-optic communications
2013 establishments in Cuba
2013 establishments in Jamaica
2013 establishments in Venezuela
Internet in Cuba